Peter Boehler (born Petrus Böhler; December 31, 1712 – April 27, 1775) was a German-English Moravian bishop and  missionary who was influential in the Moravian Church in the Americas and England during the eighteenth century.

Boehler was one of the many missionaries sent out to the Americas in the early 18th century by the leader of the Moravian Church, Nicolaus Ludwig Zinzendorf. As a part of the first large scale Protestant missionary movement, Boehler spread the religion across Georgia and other American colonies. In 1740, he migrated with other Moravians to Pennsylvania, where they founded the towns of Nazareth and Bethlehem. Boehler was superintendent of the Moravian Church in England from 1747 to 1753 and was made a bishop of the church in 1748. Boehler came back to America and directed new Moravian settlements in the colonies from 1753 to 1764.

Early life
Boehler was born in Frankfurt am Main, then part of Holy Roman Empire, on December 31, 1712. Peter was the fourth child of brewers Johann Konrad Peter Böhler and his wife Antonetta Elisabetha. Boehler attended school in Frankfurt, and went to the University of Jena in 1731. His father wanted him to study medicine, but Boehler was drawn into studying theology by the university's well-known faculty members such as Johann Franz Buddeus, Johann Georg Walch and Nicolaus Ludwig Zinzendorf. Walch and Zinzendorf greatly influenced Boehler, and showed him the ways of Pietism a movement within Lutheranism that was instrumental in the upbringing of the Methodist movement later started by John Wesley. The Pietist movement combined the Lutheran emphasis on biblical doctrine with the Reformed, but with a particular emphasis on a vigorous Christian life and behavior over intellectual doctrine. Zinzendorf used his influence on the Moravian Church to gather more supporters of the Pietist movement, including Boehler.

As a missionary
On December 15, 1737, in his first official act as bishop, Count von Zinzendorf ordained Boehler to priesthood. On February 7 of the following year, when he was in London preparing for his trip to the Americas, Boehler met John Wesley, who would later found the Methodist movement, who had just returned from a two-year stint as chaplain of  Savannah, Georgia. After Wesley met Boehler at the home of a Mr. Weinatz, a Dutch merchant living in London at the time, Wesley offered to obtain lodging for Boehler and introduced him to James Hutton, who would later be an important official in the Moravian Church. Wesley accompanied Boehler on his trip to Oxford, during which the two began an extensive and very personal discourse on the nature of faith. Wesley had returned to England as a troubled man, depressed over his lack of faith and his work in America. At the time, Wesley wrote in his journal, "I who went to America to convert others was never myself converted to God".  Boehler's counsel on the nature of grace and "heart religion" was instrumental in the conversions of both John and Charles Wesley.

Boehler himself went as a missionary to Savannah and South Carolina. As part of Zinzendorf's plans to revive the Moravian Church, Boehler preached the ways of the religion to black slaves and Native Americans, as well as white settlers in the colonies. In 1740, after the Moravians were expelled from Savannah, Boehler led the group of Moravians from Georgia to Pennsylvania. They founded the towns of Nazareth and Bethlehem, both of which are still-thriving populous Moravian communities. Boehler was almost a savior for many of the Moravian people in these communities. During times of crisis, he was accounted as the preacher who could restore the peace and hope that people were so desperately looking for. He went back to England to organize a new group of people to send to America. This group of emigrants called the "Sea Congregation" traveled with Boehler and settled in Bethlehem, Pennsylvania in 1742.

Universalist tendencies were not unknown among Moravians and Boehler himself believed in the universal reconciliation of all people. Boehler believed that the grace of Christ was so compelling that it would eventually win all hearts, a belief that is subtly distinct from Universalism. George Whitefield (an ardent Calvinist), in a letter to John Wesley, wrote that Boehler had expressed a belief that "all the damned souls would hereafter be brought out of hell."

After five years, he was made superintendent of the Moravian Church in England. The following year, Boehler was ordained as a bishop of the Moravian churches in America and England. In 1753, Boehler left his post as superintendent, and returned to America. He then served as the director of new Moravian settlements there until 1764. Boehler spent the last nine years of his life back in England, still an active member of the church. He died in London on April 27, 1775, at the age of sixty-two.

In Film
The character of Peter Boehler is portrayed by actor Bill Oberst Jr. in the 2009 feature film Wesley opposite Burgess Jenkins as John Wesley.

References

18th-century Moravian bishops
18th-century German Protestant theologians
German Christian universalists
1712 births
1775 deaths
Clergy from Frankfurt
German people of the Moravian Church
Moravian Church missionaries
German Protestant missionaries
American city founders
Christian universalist clergy
18th-century Christian universalists
Christian universalist theologians
German male non-fiction writers
Protestant missionaries in the United States